Boston Standard (previously Lincolnshire Standard) is a weekly newspaper based in the town of Boston, Lincolnshire, the Boston Target (another weekly newspaper owned by Local World) is its main rival.

As of 2015, it was owned by Johnston Press.

Boston Standard was founded in the 19th Century. It has been the main newspaper for Boston, Lincolnshire.

Publications established in the 1800s